{{Infobox media franchise
| title       = Alien
| image       = Alien (franchise) logo.png
| image_size  = 220px
| caption     = Official franchise logo
| creator     = Dan O'Bannon Ronald Shusett
| origin      = Alien (1979)
| owner       = 20th Century Studios
| years       = 1979–present
| video_games = List of video games
| novels      = List of novels
| comics      = List of comics
| magazines   = 
| films       = {{Plainlist|
 Original series:
 
 
 
 
 Alien vs. Predator films: 
 
 Prometheus films: 
 
}}
| tv          = 
| wtv         = 
| plays       = Alien: The Play (2019)
| soundtracks = 
| music       =
| attractions = 
| otherlabel1 = Character(s)
| otherdata1  = List of characters
}}Alien is a science-fiction horror and action media franchise centered on the film series which depicts warrant officer Ellen Ripley (Sigourney Weaver) and her battles with an extraterrestrial lifeform, commonly referred to as "the Alien" or Xenomorph.

Produced and distributed by 20th Century Studios, the series began with Alien (1979), directed by Ridley Scott, and was followed by three sequels: Aliens (1986), directed by James Cameron; Alien 3 (1992), directed by David Fincher, and Alien Resurrection (1997), directed by Jean-Pierre Jeunet. Scott also directed a prequel series, composed of Prometheus (2012) and Alien: Covenant (2017), which follows the exploits of the David 8 android and the creators of the eponymous creatures referred to as the "Engineers".

The series has led to numerous novels, comics, video games and an upcoming television series developed by Scott for FX on Hulu, with Noah Hawley. It has inspired a number of spin-offs – most notably the Alien vs. Predator series, which combines the continuities of the Alien franchise with the Predator franchise and consists of two films as well as various series of comics, books, and video games.

Premise

The Alien franchise depicts a series of deadly encounters, predominantly spanning the 21st and 24th centuries, between humanity and the Aliens; a hostile, endoparasitoid, extraterrestrial species. Humanity is depicted as a space-faring species with an interstellar dominion; space journeys typically last months, even years, and require the use of cryosleep. Throughout the series, characters are repeatedly manipulated and endangered by the unscrupulous megacorporation Weyland-Yutani Corp, which seeks to profit from the Aliens.

The series fictionalizes the origin of the human race. A member of an ancient humanoid species, called the "Engineers", sacrifices himself, allowing his DNA to spark the genesis of mankind. The Engineers' other experiments, designed to exterminate the human race through the means of a deadly mutagen, paves the way for the Aliens to rise and populate through the traumatic implantation of larvae in hosts. Incidents across several generations are chronicled throughout the franchise.

Background
Writer Dan O'Bannon, wanting to write a science-fiction action film, collaborated with screenwriter Ronald Shusett on a script, initially titled Star Beast, but eventually changed to Alien. Brandywine Productions, a company which had a distribution deal with 20th Century Fox, bought the script. The writers expected it to be a low-budget film, but the success of Star Wars inclined Fox to invest millions.

In the original script, the ship had an all-male crew, though it noted that all parts were gender-interchangeable. The Ripley character was initially to be played by Tom Skerritt, but when Fox president Alan Ladd Jr. and the producers at Brandywine heard rumors of Fox working on other titles with strong female leads, it was decided to cast a female as Ripley and Skerritt became Captain Dallas.

Swiss painter and sculptor H. R. Giger designed the alien creature's adult form and the derelict ship, while French artist Mœbius created the look of the spacesuits and Ron Cobb provided most of the industrial design for the sets.

While Alien, directed by Ridley Scott, was successful, Fox did not consider a sequel until 1983, when James Cameron expressed his interest to producer David Giler in continuing the Alien story. After Cameron's The Terminator became a box office hit, Cameron and partner Gale Anne Hurd were given approval to direct and produce the sequel to Alien, scheduled for a 1986 release. Cameron wrote the screenplay for Aliens from a story he developed with Giler and Walter Hill.

Following the second film, Weaver was not interested in returning to the series, so Giler and Hill commissioned a sequel without the Ripley character. Fox's president Joe Roth opposed Ripley's removal, and Weaver was offered a $5 million salary and a producer credit to make Alien 3. Giler, Hill and Larry Ferguson wrote the screenplay, based on a story from an earlier script by Vincent Ward, intended to bring closure to the Alien franchise by killing off Ripley, the principal character. Alien 3 faced a mired production, with extensive script difficulties, trouble securing a director, production beginning prior to the completion of a final script, as well as profuse studio interference.

While fans and critics initially did not receive Alien 3 well, the film was a worldwide success and piqued Fox's interest in continuing the franchise. In 1996, production on the fourth Alien film, Alien Resurrection, began. Ripley was not in the script's first draft, and Weaver was not interested in reprising the role. She joined the project after being offered an $11 million salary and more creative control, including director approval. The script, set 200 years after Alien 3, resurrected the Ripley character via human cloning. The film, directed by Jean-Pierre Jeunet, experienced an extended production, and screenwriter Joss Whedon later recounted that it had done "everything wrong" with his script. The film was released in 1997 to mixed reviews and modest box office returns, and is unsucceeded.

Films

Original series

Alien (1979)

On its way back to Earth, the commercial towing vehicle Nostromo is diverted to a desolate planetoid by a cryptic signal from a derelict alien spacecraft. Inside the alien ship, the crew discovers thousands of egg-like objects. A creature, released from one of the eggs, attaches itself to a crewman's face, rendering him unconscious. The others break quarantine to return him to the Nostromo. The parasite dies and the crewman wakes up, seemingly unaffected. Soon afterwards, an alien organism bursts from his chest and grows rapidly into a large lethal creature, which the surviving crew attempt to kill. The Nostromo is destroyed in an unsuccessful attempt to kill the creature, leaving Ellen Ripley as the only survivor in the ship's lifeboat.

Aliens (1986)

After 57 years in hypersleep, Ripley awakens aboard a medical space station orbiting Earth. She recounts the events of the Nostromo but is disbelieved by her superiors in the Weyland Yutani corporation, which has now begun to terraform and colonise the planetoid from the first film. When contact with the colony is lost, Ripley is persuaded to accompany a squad of marines to investigate. They discover the colonists have been wiped out after being directed by the company to secure the derelict ship reported by Ripley. There is only one survivor, a girl named Newt. The aliens vastly outnumber and quickly overwhelm the marines, who fight for survival. Only a handful, including Ripley and Newt, escape.

Alien 3 (1992)

Immediately following the events of Aliens, the military ship USS Sulaco, carrying the survivors, catches fire. The occupants are ejected in an escape pod, which crash-lands on the refinery/prison planet Fiorina "Fury" 161. All on board except Ripley are killed. An alien facehugger is also aboard, and impregnates an animal with an alien, which soon begins killing inmates and wardens. Ripley discovers an alien queen is growing inside her, and is determined to kill both herself and the creature before Weyland Yutani can exploit them.

Alien Resurrection (1997)

Two hundred years after the events of Alien 3, several clones of Ripley, including the alien queen she was carrying, are grown by the military aboard the USM Auriga. The military intends to exploit the aliens, and uses humans kidnapped and delivered to them by a group of mercenaries as hosts for the queen's eggs. The Aliens escape, and Ripley 8 (a clone mixed with Alien DNA) and the mercenaries attempt to escape and destroy the Auriga before it reaches Earth.

Crossover series

Inspired by the Dark Horse Comics series, the filmmakers of Predator 2 (1990) incorporated an Easter egg in which an Alien skull was seen in a Predator trophy case. Expansions upon this shared universe between the Alien and Predator franchises followed through comics and video games, leading up to the launch of a film franchise with the release of Alien vs. Predator in 2004, followed by Aliens vs. Predator: Requiem in 2007. The franchise has spawned various comics, novels, video games, and other merchandise based upon or inspired by the films. A third film has been variously rumored since the production of Requiem. In mid-2018, Shane Black, the director of The Predator, expressed his belief that a third Alien vs. Predator could still happen, indicating the studio's interest in both franchises.

Alien vs. Predator (2004)

In 2004, a Predator mothership arrives in Earth orbit to draw humans to an ancient Predator training ground on Bouvetøya, an island about one thousand miles north of Antarctica. A buried pyramid giving off a "heat bloom" attracts a group of explorers led by billionaire and self-taught engineer Charles Bishop Weyland (Lance Henriksen), the original founder and CEO of Weyland Industries, who unknowingly activates an Alien egg production line as a hibernating Alien Queen is awakened within the pyramid. Three Predators descend unto the planet and enters the structure, killing all humans in their way with the intention of hunting the newly formed Aliens, while the scattered explorers are captured alive by Aliens and implanted with embryos. Two Predators die in the ensuing battle with an Alien, while the third allies itself with the lone surviving human, Alexa "Lex" Woods (Sanaa Lathan), while making their way out of the pyramid as it is destroyed by the Predator's wrist bomb and eventually does battle with the escaped Alien Queen on the surface. The Queen is defeated by being dragged down by a water tower into the dark depths of the frozen sea, but not before she fatally wounds the last Predator. The orbiting Predator mothership uncloaks and the crew retrieves the fallen Predator. A Predator elder gives Lex a spear as a sign of respect, and then departs. Once in orbit it is revealed that an Alien Chestburster was present within the corpse, thus a Predalien hybrid is born.

Aliens vs. Predator: Requiem (2007)

Set immediately after the events of the previous film, the Predalien hybrid aboard the Predator scout ship, having just separated from the mothership shown in the previous film, has grown to full adult size and sets about killing the Predators aboard the ship, causing it to crash in the small town of Gunnison, Colorado. The last surviving Predator activates a distress beacon containing a video recording of the Predalien, which is received by a veteran Predator on the Predator homeworld, who sets off towards Earth to "clean up" the infestation. When it arrives, the Predator tracks the Aliens into a section of the sewer below the town. He removes evidence of their presence as he moves along using a corrosive blue liquid and uses a laser net to try to contain the creatures, but the Aliens still manage to escape into the town above. The Predator fashions a plasma pistol from its remaining plasma caster and hunts Aliens all across town, accidentally cutting the power to the town in the process. During a confrontation with human survivors, the Predator loses its plasma pistol. The Predator then fights the Predalien singlehandedly, and the two mortally wound one another just as the US air force drops a tactical nuclear bomb on the town, incinerating both combatants along with the Predalien's warriors and hive, as well as the few remaining humans in the town. The salvaged plasma pistol is then taken to a Ms. Cullen Yutani of the Yutani Corporation, foreshadowing an advancement in technology leading to the future events of the Alien films.

Prequel series
Development of a prequel story began in the early 2000s when both Ridley Scott and James Cameron started to develop ideas for a story that would explore the origins of the Alien. In 2002, the development of Alien vs. Predator had taken precedence and the prequel project remained dormant until 2009. Jon Spaihts wrote the first screenplay for the project, but Scott then opted for a different direction and hired Damon Lindelof in 2010, to rewrite the script into a story that focused on the creators of the Aliens, rather than the Aliens themselves. The film, titled Prometheus, was released in 2012 to box office success and mostly positive reviews.

By 2014, development on the second prequel was underway, with Scott returning as director. The film's screenplay was initially written by Jack Paglen in 2013, but was subsequently rewritten by Michael Green and Dante Harper, before Scott's collaborator from Gladiator, John Logan, wrote the final version. The film, titled Alien: Covenant, commenced production in February 2016 and was released on May 19, 2017. Alien: Covenant was a box office disappointment, grossing $240.9 million worldwide against a production budget of $97 million, while also receiving lukewarm critical reviews. The story of the prequel series centers around the android David 8, and two crews he accompanies on expeditions to meet the mysterious Engineers.

Prometheus (2012)

Some 30 years before the events of Alien, scientists Elizabeth Shaw and Charlie Holloway discover a star map among the remnants of several ancient Earth cultures. Accompanied by David 8 and hoping to discover the origins of humanity, they journey aboard the spaceship USCSS Prometheus and arrive on the distant planet LV-223 in the Zeta2 Reticuli system, the same region of space in which the planetoid LV-426 from Alien is found. There they discover the ancient remains of an advanced civilization, called the Engineers (the same race as the dead pilot from the derelict ship in Alien), who were developing biological weapons in the form of a pathogenic mutagen which could have driven the human race extinct. The horrors they encounter result in the loss of the crew except for David and Shaw.

Alien: Covenant (2017)

Eleven years after the events of Prometheus, the colony ship USCSS Covenant, carrying thousands of colonists and hundreds of human embryos in cryo-stasis, makes its way towards the planet Origae-6. The crew is awakened by a neutrino blast and intercepts a transmission sent from Shaw, which they decide to trace to an apparently habitable Engineer home world (referred to as Planet 4), devoid of all non-floral life. When several crew members are infected by the same mutagen encountered by the Prometheus crew and give birth to a new breed of Alien, the Neomorphs, the android David 8 rescues them. It is revealed that he brought Shaw to the planet, where he killed all non-floral life and began experimenting on Shaw's corpse to engineer his own breeds of Aliens. His motivations to replace human life with Aliens is made apparent, and with the birth of yet another new breed of Alien, a terraforming expert named Daniels and the remaining crew are forced to flee from the world. After disposing of the Aliens chasing them, the crew members return to the Covenant and are put back into cryosleep by someone they believe to be their shipboard synthetic, Walter. Only when Daniels is put in her cryopod does she realize that Walter has been replaced by the identical David. With the crew, colonists, and embryos at his mercy, David contacts Weyland-Yutani back on Earth, stating that while the majority of the crew was killed in the neutrino blast, they would continue to Origae-6.

Future
In the mid-1990s, screenwriter Stuart Hazeldine wrote a treatment titled Alien: Earthbound. Fox executives were impressed by the script, having read it after Alien Resurrection had entered post-production. According to Sigourney Weaver, Joss Whedon had written an Earth-set script for Alien 5, but Weaver was not interested and wanted it to be set on the original planetoid. She has remained open to a role on the condition that she likes the story. Before 20th Century Fox greenlit Alien vs. Predator, James Cameron had been collaborating on the plot for a fifth Alien film with another writer, but ceased work on learning of the crossover. Cameron stated that the crossover would "kill the validity of the franchise", and that "it was Frankenstein Meets Werewolf" – like "Universal just taking their assets and starting to play them off against each other." Although he liked the final product, he ruled out any future involvement with the series. In late 2008, Weaver hinted in an interview with MTV that she and Scott were working on an Alien spin-off film, which would focus on the chronicles of Ellen Ripley rather than on the Aliens, but the continuation of Ripley's story has not materialized.

Sigourney Weaver has expressed her interest in returning to the role of Ripley with Neill Blomkamp's story (purportedly titled Alien: Awakening) which would tie into the first two Alien films by taking place after Aliens and foregoing involvement with the other two sequels. This was canceled in favor of Scott's own untitled third prequel (also purportedly titled Alien: Awakening), which was later also canceled following the disappointing box office results of Alien: Covenant. In February 2019, James Cameron stated that he was working on reviving Blomkamp's project. In June 2020, Brandywine Productions revealed that a screenplay for a new installment in the original series called "Alien V", centered around Ripley, had been written by Walter Hill and David Giler. In an interview with The Hollywood Reporter published in September 2022, Hill confirmed in that the proposed alternative sequel involving Weaver would not be moving forward.

After the acquisition of 21st Century Fox by The Walt Disney Company, it was officially confirmed at the 2019 CinemaCon that future Alien films are in development. In May 2019, Variety reported that the third prequel film was "in the script phase", with Ridley Scott attached to serve once again as director. In September 2020, Scott confirmed that work on the next installment is ongoing, but was undecided with keeping it tied in with the plot set out in Prometheus and Alien: Covenant.

In March 2022, The Hollywood Reporter reported that a new Alien film set separately from the earlier films is set to be released by Hulu directed by Fede Álvarez and produced by Ridley Scott. Álvarez pitched the idea to Scott years prior and now has the opportunity to be involved. That November, Cailee Spaeny was announced to be in talks for the lead role. Under the working title, Alien: Romulus, filming was scheduled to begin on February 6 at Origo Studios in Budapest, Hungary. In March 2023, Isabela Merced joined Spaeny in an undisclosed role. The official date of filming is set for March 9.

Short films

In 2012 and 2017 respectively, Ridley Scott directed eight short films to tie in with the releases of Prometheus and Alien: Covenant. In July 2018, it was reported that 20th Century Fox had joined forces with Tongal to produce short films, intended to coincide with the 40th anniversary of the Alien franchise. By March 2019, the details of the short films were released. Tongal co-founder and CEO James DeJulio stated that the joint-production is "reflective of Tongal's mission to bring creative opportunities to the next generation of talent." The shorts were released weekly on IGN, after which they were uploaded to the Alien Universe web page, as well as all Alien social media pages on May 5 of the same year. All six of the short films premiered at the Emerald City Comic Con in Seattle. The 40th anniversary short films are available as a Movies Anywhere-exclusive bonus feature accompanying the digital release of Alien.

Television

Early ideas
In 1979, 20th Century Fox considered producing a television series based upon the 1979 film Alien and hoped that ABC would pick it up but its only media coverage was found in the June 1980 Fangoria issue #6 and it ended up abandoned as the 1986 sequel Aliens arrived on the scene. In 1992, a now cancelled animated series inspired by the 1986 film Aliens titled Operation: Aliens was being produced along with an LCD game, board game, a Sega Genesis video game, and action figures. However the brand lived on through Kenner toylines as simply Aliens and in the comics series included with the action figures as well as in the Aliens/Predator Universe trading cards set. In 2007, Ain't It Cool News reported that a (since then cancelled) animated series inspired by the 1986 film Aliens titled Aliens: War Games was being produced.

Alien television series
On December 10, 2020, as part of Disney's Investor Day presentation, a new TV series project based on the franchise was announced to be in development for FX on Hulu, with Noah Hawley and Scott being involved (the former as showrunner and the latter as producer). It will be set on Earth in the near future, thus marking the first of the franchise to do so without featuring Ellen Ripley. At the 2021 Television Critics Association Press Tour, FX network's John Landgraf said that the series will probably premiere in 2023. A casting sheet for characters Hermit and Wendy shed light on the show's leads. Reports suggested that the TV series would start filming in March 2022, but production has been delayed until 2023.

Web series

Alien: Isolation – The Digital Series (2019)

In 2014, Sega published the video game Alien: Isolation. In 2019, a seven-episode animated adaptation of Alien: Isolation was released on February 28. The series, developed by 20th Century Fox, in conjunction with Reverse Engineering Studios and DVgroup, was created using a combination of brand-new scenes animated from scratch, cinematics taken directly from the original game, and digital recreations of first-person scenes from the game. Alien: Isolation is set in 2137, 15 years after the events of Alien and 42 years prior to Aliens, following Amanda Ripley, who is investigating the disappearance of her mother, Ellen Ripley, as she is transferred to the space station Sevastopol to find the flight recorder of the Nostromo only to discover an Alien has terrorized the station, killing the vast majority of the crew. Andrea Deck reprises her role as Amanda Ripley.

Cast and crew

Principal cast

Additional crew

Reception
List indicator
 indicates figures based on available information.

Figures in this table are not inflation adjusted. Where two different figures are quoted for box office grosses, information is taken from two different sources.

Box office performance

Critical and public response

Alien was nominated for two Academy Awards, winning for Best Visual Effects. Aliens received seven nominations, including a Best Actress nomination for Sigourney Weaver, and won for Best Visual Effects and Best Sound Effects. Alien 3 was nominated for Best Visual Effects. Prometheus was also nominated for Best Visual Effects. Alien was also inducted into the National Film Registry of the Library of Congress for historical preservation as a film which is "culturally, historically, or aesthetically significant."

The American Film Institute ranked Alien as the sixth most thrilling American movie and seventh-best film in the science fiction genre, and in the AFI's 100 Years... 100 Heroes and Villains list, Ripley was ranked eighth among the heroes, and the Alien was fourteenth among the villains. IGN listed Alien as the thirteenth best film franchise of all time in 2006.

Accolades

Academy Awards

Alien Day
"Alien Day", April 26, has become the fan celebration day for the Alien franchise. The date derives from LV-426, the "426" converting to "4/26" or "April 26". On Alien Day 2016, Neill Blomkamp released new art for his concept of Alien 5, and the Audible Original audio play adaptation of Alien: Out of the Shadows was released. On Alien Day 2017, 20th Century Fox released "The Crossing" prologue short film for Alien: Covenant, and the Audible Original audio play adaptation of Alien: River of Pain was released.

Alien: The Play
From March 19 to 22, 2019, North Bergen High School (New Jersey, US) staged an adaptation of Alien entitled Alien: The Play, which was widely praised and granted seals of approval by Ridley Scott, James Cameron, Sigourney Weaver and Walter Hill. In the aftermath of the play's popularity and approval, North Bergen Mayor Nick Sacco's non-profit foundation pledged funds for more performances.

In academia
The Bishop character has been the subject of literary and philosophical analysis as a high-profile android character conforming to science fiction author Isaac Asimov's Three Laws of Robotics and as a model of a compliant, potentially self-aware machine. The portrayal of androids in the Alien series—Ash in Alien, Bishop in Aliens and Alien 3, and Call (Winona Ryder) in Alien Resurrection (1997)—has been studied for its implications relating to how humans deal with the presence of an "Other", as Ripley treats them with fear and suspicion, and a form of "hi-tech racism and android apartheid" is present throughout the series. This is seen as part of a larger trend of technophobia in films prior to the 1990s, with Bishop's role being particularly significant as he redeems himself at the end of Aliens, thus confounding Ripley's expectations.

Music

Home media
There have been dozens of stand-alone releases of the individual films on various formats, including Betamax, VHS, Laserdisc, DVD, and Blu-ray. The multiple single releases on VHS were generally the original theatrical cuts of each film.

Laserdisc saw single releases of all theatrical versions, as well as two so-called "box sets" which only contained one film (there were two single releases, one each for Alien and Aliens) but had multiple discs and a large amount of supplemental material with a high retail price tag (around US$100). The Aliens set included a new "Special Edition" cut of the film completed by James Cameron just for this release, which was a significantly extended version of the film.

The films made their DVD debut in 1999, both as part of a boxed set (see Alien Legacy below) and as separate single-disc releases of each film (Aliens was only available in its "Special Edition" cut, not its original theatrical cut, which did not make it to DVD until the next boxed set). Following the Alien Quadrilogy set (see below), each film received individual two-disc releases containing the content of each film from that set. Since then, there have been multiple issues and reissues of the films, in both their theatrical or extended version, though some single releases include both.

In addition to the single releases, there have been seven complete box sets of the series at various points in its history. With the exception of the DVD version of the Aliens Triple Pack, each release contained all films that had come out at the time the sets were released. The seven box sets each had unique characteristics and features which were then sometimes reused in later sets or single releases in one form or another, most notably the Blu-ray Anthology, which includes a detailed archive of many previous releases, including the rare Laserdisc box sets.
 Alien Triple Pack (VHS, 1992), containing the first two films in the series and a third cassette with a 23-minute preview of the then upcoming theatrical release of Alien 3. (Not to be confused with the 2008 DVD set of the same name below.)
 Alien Trilogy (VHS, 1993), a three-cassette packaging of Alien, Aliens (in its LaserDisc Special Edition cut, for the first time on another format) and Alien 3.
 Alien Saga (VHS, 1997), UK boxed set with the first three films plus a "Making of Alien Resurrection" cassette. It was released again in 1998 with the Alien Resurrection film included. A Japan-exclusive Laserdisc pack containing the first three films released in 1999 also had the same name. (A planned U.S. version was canceled as DVDs were quickly taking over the much smaller domestic Laserdisc market in that country.)
 Alien Legacy (VHS/DVD, 1999), a four-volume set containing the 1991 Laserdisc "Special Edition" cut of Aliens, the theatrical versions of the other three films, and on DVD various supplemental materials that were either re-used from Laserdisc or newly created.
 Alien Quadrilogy (DVD, 2003), considered one of the most exhaustive box sets of the DVD era in terms of content and special features, was spread over nine discs: four discs (one disc each) for the theatrical and extended cuts of each film (new "2003" cuts of Alien, Alien 3, and Alien Resurrection and the previously released 1991 "Special Edition" cut of Aliens), four discs containing special features specific to each film, and an extra disc of documentaries and other supplemental content.
 The films were later re-released as two-disc individual titles as part of 20th Century Fox's Collector's Series.
 Alien Triple Pack (DVD, 2008), a three-disc package including the theatrical cuts of Alien and Alien 3, as well as the "Special Edition" of Aliens. This set reused the name of the 1992 VHS set (this was an unusual release in that Alien Resurrection was not included, making this the first franchise box set it had not appeared in since its release).
 Alien Anthology (Blu-ray, 2010), an exclusive six-disc release featuring two versions of each film (theatrical, and the 2003 cuts from the Alien Quadrilogy set—except for changes to the 2003 Alien 3 "Workprint" version which included having some original voice actors come back to re-record poorly captured dialogue in newly inserted extended scenes, and fixed production errors on the "special edition" of Aliens) and almost all special features and supplements from the previous releases (including an archive of the special edition Laserdisc box sets with all their image galleries and other unique content). As with the Quadrilogy DVD, the two versions of each film were housed on a single disc, while the storage capacity of Blu-ray means the previous five discs of special features were included on the remaining two discs in the set, which held approximately 60 hours of bonus video content and over 12,000 still images. Most subsequent releases of the films on the Blu-ray medium are repackaged versions of the Blu-ray disks contained in this box set. A discount box set without the two additional discs of bonus features was also released.
 Alien/Aliens Dual Pack (DVD), including the theatrical cuts of both Alien and Aliens. A separate dual pack was released containing the theatrical and extended versions of Alien vs. Predator and the unrated Aliens vs. Predator: Requiem.
 Prometheus to Alien: The Evolution (Blu-ray, 2012), containing all of the Alien films, Prometheus, and a bonus material disk for Prometheus.
 All of the Alien films, including Prometheus, have been released in special Steelbook Blu-ray editions, although these do not come in a boxed set. While the Alien Steelbooks themselves contain the Blu-ray disks on their own, the Prometheus Steelbook contains both Blu-ray and Blu-ray 3D versions of the film, as well as a bonus feature Blu-ray disk with seven hours of content. With the exception of Prometheus, the films had been previously released as DVD Definitive editions, which featured Steelbook casing and contained both DVD versions (theatrical and directors cuts) of the films and a bonus feature disk.
 Alien: The 35th Anniversary Edition (Blu-ray, 2014), released to mark the 35th anniversary of the release of the film, containing both a Blu-ray and a Digital HD copy, a reprint of Alien: The Illustrated Story and a series of collectible art cards containing artwork by H. R. Giger related to the film. The disk itself is the same as the respective disk on the 2010 Anthology Blu-ray release, and contains MOTHER mode, despite the lack of the required bonus disk. A reprint of the novel by Alan Dean Foster was also released, along with reprints of all other novels, with the Alien Resurrection novel available as of May 2015.
 The Alien Universe box set was released exclusively through Walmart on April 18, 2017, and included four limited edition poster cards designed by the Mondo art company.
 The Alien 6 Film Collection, released in 2017 in regular Blu-ray and Steelbook, contains all 6 films in the franchise.

Other media
There exists a great number of spin-offs in other media, including a large number of crossovers with the Predator franchise.

Print media
Alien print media has been published since shortly before the release of the original eponymous film, in 1979. The full library of these literary works include novelizations of the films, original content that expand upon the fictional universe, comics and companion books for both the cataloging of in-universe elements and supplemental works concerning the development of the franchise. These include works by special effects company Amalgamated Dynamics Incorporated (ADI), which assisted with the effects in Alien 3 and Alien Resurrection.

Novels

Several novelizations of each of the six films and some comic books as well as original canonical novels based on the franchise have been released. The original novels include Alien: Out of the Shadows, Alien: Sea of Sorrows, Alien: River of Pain, marketed as the "Canonical Alien Trilogy" and the short story collection Aliens: Bug Hunt. Out of the Shadows and River of Pain were adapted into audio dramas in 2016 and 2017 respectively released on the Alien Day of the respective year. Alan Dean Foster published Alien: Covenant – Origins, a novel set between the events of Prometheus and Alien: Covenant.

Comic books

In addition to Alien: The Illustrated Story, a graphic novel adaptation of the original film, there have been numerous limited series set in the Alien universe, as well as non-canonical crossover appearances of the Alien. In addition to Alien vs. Predator comics featuring the Alien and Predator battling, Dark Horse Comics published Fire and Stone between 2014 and 2017, crossing over the continuities of the Alien prequel series with the Alien vs. Predator franchise.

Dark Horse Comics also published a number of other miniseries crossovers, featuring the Alien species as an enemy pitted against prolific characters from other continuities. In 1995, the miniseries Superman/Aliens featured Aliens fighting against Superman, while his powers are diminished. Between 1997 and 2002, a two-part miniseries called Batman/Aliens was published, depicting Batman fighting against a horde of Aliens in a jungle bordering Mexico and Guatemala. In 1998, WildStorm, (now a part of Image Comics), and Dark Horse Comics published an intercompany crossover event called WildC.A.T.s/Aliens, featuring the Wildcats battling the Aliens. Green Lantern Versus Aliens, an intercompany crossover event between Dark Horse and DC Comics, features a plot beyond either continuity, where the Aliens residing on the Green Lantern planet Mogo get out of control and must be exterminated. In 2003, Dark Horse published Judge Dredd vs. Aliens, depicting an Alien invasion in Mega-City One, necessitating for Judge Dredd to intervene, to destroy the infestation.

In July 2020, Marvel Comics announced that it had acquired the comic book rights to the Alien franchise, in addition to the rights to the Predator and Alien vs. Predator franchises. Marvel announced the Alien series in December 2020, with Phillip Kennedy Johnson writing and Salvador Larroca illustrating it. Issue #1 was released in March 2021.

Picture books
Jonesy: Nine Lives on the Nostromo is a 2018 picture book that retells the plot of Alien (1979) from the perspective of Jones, the ship's cat from the film.

Video games

Since the launch of the Alien franchise, there have been numerous video games released over the years, spanning a variety of genres. In addition to appearances in crossover video games, including those from the Alien vs. Predator franchise and Mortal Kombat X, the four films from the original series were adapted into video games, typically multiple times. The first release was Alien (1982) for the Atari 2600, inspired heavily by Pac-Man. A second adaptation of the first film was released in 1984. The sequel, Aliens was adapted into four different video games: two different 1986 games titled Aliens: The Computer Game, a collection of minigames by Activision and a first-person shooter by Software Studios; as well as two different games titled Aliens, a 1987 MSX platformer by Square and a 1990 arcade shoot 'em up by Konami. Acclaim Entertainment released three different games based on Alien 3; two different run and gun platformers - one for consoles in 1992, another for the SNES a year later - and a Game Boy adventure game in 1993. Sega also released a light gun arcade game Alien 3: The Gun in 1993. Acclaim's first-person shooter Alien Trilogy was released in 1996 and their adaptation of Alien Resurrection was released in 2000 as a PlayStation first-person shooter.

Other Alien games include Mindscape's adventure game Aliens: A Comic Book Adventure (1995), the first-person shooter Aliens Online (1998), the Game Boy Color action game Aliens: Thanatos Encounter (2001), the mobile phone game Aliens: Unleashed (2003), and the arcade game Aliens: Extermination (2006). In 2014, Play Mechanix and Raw Thrills released Aliens: Armageddon, a rail gun first person shooter that hit arcades soon after. Between 2016 and 2017, Zen Studios released downloadable content packs in a product line called "Alien vs. Pinball", featuring three virtual pinball tables based around the Alien and Alien vs. Predator franchises for Zen Pinball 2, Pinball FX 2 and Pinball FX 3.

In 2006, Sega made a deal with Fox Licensing to release two Alien video games for sixth generation consoles. The first was Aliens: Colonial Marines, a first-person shooter by Gearbox Software that was released in 2013 for the Xbox 360, PlayStation 3 and Windows. The game is set between Aliens and Alien 3, following a group of marines sent to investigate the Sulaco who wound up crash-landing on LV-426. 

The second was Alien: Isolation, a survival-horror game by Creative Assembly that follows Ripley's daughter, Amanda, who is stranded aboard an Alien-infested space station. The game experienced a long development cycle, with it finally being released in late 2014 for seventh generation consoles. During the prolonged development of Alien: Isolation, Sega also released a Nintendo DS game Aliens Infestation in 2011. Furthermore, a spin-off featuring Amanda Ripley called Alien: Blackout was released for mobile devices in 2019.

Merchandising
Despite Alien being widely considered a mature and non child-appropriate series, merchandise - including action figures, board games and role-playing games - has been manufactured and marketed to a wide range of age groups. Prior to the release of the first film, 20th Century Fox executives signed a deal with Kenner Products, for the production of a board game called Alien Game, as well as action figures, marketed for being family-friendly. Following the release of the film and the outcry from parents about its nature of being a graphic and mature horror film, the product lines were abruptly cancelled. The merchandising efforts for the franchise remained largely stagnant until the release of the more action-based sequel, Aliens, seven years later. From thereon out, merchandise has been produced on a rolling, ongoing basis.

From the franchise's inception until Kenner's closure in 2000, the company was a major manufacturer of Alien action figures. From 1992 to 1995, Kenner produced a line of action figures dubbed Aliens, initially intended to promote a cancelled animated series called Operation: Aliens. In 1996, Galoob released the Micro Machines Alien line of miniature toys, but ceased production the following year, due in large to the violent and graphic nature of its packaging art. Following the founding of Hong Kong collectible toy company Hot Toys, one of the first lines the company began producing was Alien. In 2014, Funko released a line of action figures heavily inspired by the original 1979 Kenner line called ReAction. In the 2010s, the National Entertainment Collectibles Association (NECA) took a prominent role in the manufacturing of Alien action figures, with the majority being largely inspired by the Kenner line of action figures, as well as new additions depicting the prequel films and crossover continuities, such as Alien vs. Predator and Superman/Aliens.

Following Kenner's ill-fated first foray into the board game market with Alien Game, merchandising efforts in the medium were stagnant, until Leading Edge Games released the cooperative game Aliens in 1989. Leading Edge Games released Aliens Adventure Game in 1991, to mixed reviews and commentary that states it functions closer to a board game than a traditional tabletop RPG. In 1993, British toy company Peter Pan Playthings Ltd released a board game called Operation: Aliens — Combat Game, in which up to four players play as Colonial Marines and compete to reach the center of the board and self-destruct the Alien-infested facility. In December 2019, Swedish publisher Free League Publishing released a tabletop role-playing game called Alien: The Role-Playing Game, featuring two game modes. An upcoming licensed board game titled Alien: USCSS Nostromo is set for release in 2020. However, in 2018, a French board game designer named François Bachelart accused the game's publisher, Wonder Dice, of theft of a game concept he pitched to them years prior. Wonder Dice published a press release, in which they threatened to sue anyone who would question their legal practices.

Theme park attractions
An Alien-themed attraction debuted at the Genting SkyWorlds Theme Park in Malaysia in February 2022. The Park, previously known as '20th Century Fox World', has faced significant delays during construction, however, a licensing deal with Fox and new parent company The Walt Disney Company was reached. Pre-show footage of the ride was released online, and appears to detail a Weyland-Yutani themed drop tower attraction.

Alien was also previously represented in The Great Movie Ride at Disney's Hollywood Studios at Walt Disney World from 1989 until the attraction's closure in 2017. The attraction featured a scene based on the first film, in which riders were taken through the Nostromo, encountering Audio-Animatronic representations of Ripley and a Xenomorph.

Alien vs. Predator franchise

Inspired by the Dark Horse Comics series, the filmmakers of Predator 2 (1990) incorporated an easter egg in which an Alien skull was seen in a Predator trophy case. Expansions upon this shared universe between the Alien and Predator franchises followed through comics and video games, leading up to the launch of a film franchise with the release of Alien vs. Predator in 2004, followed by Aliens vs. Predator: Requiem in 2007. The franchise has spawned various comics, novels, video games, and other merchandise based upon or inspired by the films. A third film has been variously rumored since the production of Requiem. In mid-2018, Shane Black, the director of The Predator, expressed his belief that a third Alien vs. Predator could still happen, indicating the studio's interest in both franchises, with Françoise Yip then reprising her role as Cullen Yutani from Requiem in a silent cameo appearance in The Predator, after her speaking scenes were cut.

The Predator (2018)

Stuntwoman Breanna Watkins, in scenes that were filmed but not used, portrayed a masked Ellen Ripley in one alternate ending of Shane Black's The Predator (2018), and an unmasked adult Rebecca "Newt" Jorden in a second alternate ending, meant to tie the main Predator franchise to the Alien franchise in which the characters first appeared, in a manner separate from the pre-existing Alien vs. Predator franchise and incorporating the plot element of time travel; Watkins later elaborated that of the two roles portrayed, while she was serving as a stand-in for Ellen Ripley ahead of a failed attempt at a Sigourney Weaver cameo, that she had actually portrayed Newt Jorden in the original ending, and had been in early discussions about potentially reprising the role in a potential Alien vs. Predator-focused sequel to The Predator.

See also

 List of space science fiction franchises
 List of films featuring extraterrestrials
 List of monster movies

References

Further reading

 Alien Woman: The Making of Lt. Ellen Ripley (by Ximena Gallardo C. and C. Jason Smith, Continuum, 272 pages, 2004)
 The Book of Alien (by Paul Scanlon and Michael Gross, Star Books, 112 pages, 1979, Titan Books, 2003)
 Making of Alien Resurrection (by Andrew Murdock and Rachel Aberly, Harper Prism, 1997 )
 The Complete Aliens Companion (by Paul Sammon, Harper Prism, 1998)
 The Alien Quartet: A Bloomsbury Movie Guide (by David Earl Thomson, Bloomsbury Publishing, 208 pages, 1999, as The Alien Quartet (Pocket Movie Guide), 2000 )
 Beautiful Monsters: The Unofficial and Unauthorized Guide to the Alien and Predator Films (by David A. McIntee, Telos, 272 pages, 2005)
 Alien Vault: The Definitive Story of the Making of The Film (By Ian Nathan) 2011, 176 pages. Includes inserts with sticker, mini posters, art and storyboards, Blueprints and other material.

External links

 

 
American film series
Action film franchises
Horror film franchises
Science fiction film franchises
Science fiction horror film series
Film franchises introduced in 1979
20th Century Studios franchises
Fiction about parasites